RBU is a time code radio station located in Moscow. It transmits a continuous 10 kW time code on 66⅔ kHz. This is commonly written as 66.66 or 66.666 kHz, but is actually 200/3 kHz. Until 2008, the transmitter site was near Kupavna  and used as antenna three T-antennas spun between three 150 metres tall grounded masts.

RBU is controlled by All-Russian Scientific Research Institute for Physical-Engineering and Radiotechnical Metrology. It is operated by Russian Television and Radio Broadcasting Network.

Time code 
Every 100 ms, synchronized to the UTC second, one bit is transmitted:

100 Hz modulation encodes a binary 0, while 312.5 Hz modulation encodes a binary 1.

Each UTC second consists of 10 such bits. 6 of them are fixed, two encode minute boundaries, and two provide time code information:

Each minute, the two bits of time code encode the local time of the following minute (like DCF77) and some additional information. Because the time code starts with two 1 bits, the top of the minute is uniquely marked by 5 consecutive 1 bits.

dUT1 is an additional, higher-precision correction to DUT1. UT1 = UTC + DUT1 + dUT1.
Bits with a weight of ± are 0 for positive, 1 for negative. The time transmitted is Moscow local time; UTC can be computed by subtracting the value of the ΔUT field.

References

Time signal radio stations
Time in Russia
Call signs